Anri Girshevich Volokhonsky (19 March 1936 – 8 April 2017) was a Russian poet and translator.

Early years
Volokhonsky was born in Leningrad and graduated from university with a degree in chemistry. In 1973, he emigrated to Israel and then moved to Germany in 1985. Between 1985 and 1995, Volokhonsky lived in Munich, where he worked for Radio Free Europe/Radio Liberty, and in 1995 he moved to Tübingen. His sister, Larissa Volokhonsky, eventually became a translator.

Career
Volokhonsky began writing poetry in the 1950s. He published several books of poetry, some of them together with Alexei Khvostenko. Most of the poetry is ironic and is considered to be descended from Oberiu. Perhaps his most famous piece was lyrics on "Canzona by Francesco da Milano", written by Vladimir Vavilov, the song called "The City of Gold". The song, in turn, would become a hit in the 1980s when it was performed by Aquarium for the soundtrack for the film Assa.
Volokhonsky also worked with Leonid Fyodorov, the frontman of the Auktyon, and wrote texts for his albums.

He also translated Catullus and fragments of Finnegans Wake by James Joyce into Russian.

Death
He died on 8 April 2017 in Rexingen, where he had lived since 2004.

Bibliography
 Devyaty Renessans (Девятый Ренессанс, Haifa, 1977).
 Stikhi dlya Ksenii (Стихи для Ксении, Tiberias, 1978).
 Chetyre Poemy ob Odnom (Четыре поэмы об одном, Tiberias, 1981).
 Roman-Pokoynichek, (Роман - Покойничек, New York, 1982), a novel.
 Stikhotvoreniya (Стихотворения, Ann Arbor, 1983).
 Basni A. Kh. V. (Басни А.Х.В., Paris, 1984), with Alexei Khvostenko.
 Bytiye i Apokalipsis (Бытие и Апокалипсис, Jerusalem, 1984).
 Smert Pu-i (Смерть Пу-и, New York, 1984).
 Tetrad Igreyny (Тетрадь Игрейны, Jerusalem, 1984).
 Pokhvala Toporovu (Похвала Топорову, Hamburg, 1986).
 Shkura Bubna (Шкура бубна, Jerusalem, 1986).
 Izvest (Известь, Paris, 1990).
 Stikhi o Prichinakh (Стихи о причинах, Moscow, 1990).
 Gorodskiye Polya (Городские поля, Paris, 1991).
 Povest o Lane i Tarbagane (Повеcть о Лане и Тарбагане, Paris, 1991).
 Anyutiny Gryadki (Анютины грядки, Perm, 1994).
 Tiveriadskiye Poemy (Тивериадские поэмы, Moscow, 2001).
 Berloga Pchyol (Берлога пчёл, Tver, 2004).
 Vospominaniya o Davno Pozabytom (Воспоминания о давно позабытом, Moscow, 2007).

References

1936 births
2017 deaths
Writers from Saint Petersburg
Russian emigrants to Germany
Russian emigrants to Israel
Russian Jews
20th-century Russian poets
Jewish poets
Russian male poets
20th-century Russian male writers
20th-century Russian translators